Bulti may be:
 Bulṭī, Arabic name of Nile tilapia, a type of fish used in Egyptian cuisine
 Bulti, older spelling of Balti:
 Balti people, an ethic group of Little Tibet
 Balti language, their language
 Bulti, an Ethiopian surname
Wodajo Bulti (born 1957), Ethiopian long-distance runner

See also 
 Balti (disambiguation)